The ARIA Digital Track Chart ranks the best-performing digital tracks of Australia. It is published by Australian Recording Industry Association (ARIA), an organisation who collects music data for the weekly ARIA Charts.
To be eligible to appear on the chart, the recording must be a single not an EP and only paid downloads counted from downloadable outlets.
The First issue counted was week ending 10 April.

Chart history

Number-one artists

See also
List of number-one singles of 2006 (Australia)

References

Australia Digital Singles
2006 in Australian music
Digital 2006